Hall Township is one of twenty-five townships in Bureau County, Illinois, USA. As of the 2020 census, its population was 8,258 and it contained 3,777 housing units. Hall Township changed its name from Bloom Township in June 1850.

Geography

Cities
 Dalzell (vast majority)
 De Pue (east edge)
 Ladd
 Seatonville (east three-quarters)
 Spring Valley

Unincorporated towns

 Marquette
 Ottville
 Webster Park

Cemeteries
The township contains eleven cemeteries:

 Ladd
 Lithuanian
 Miller
 Mount Olivet Catholic
 Ottville
 Saint Annes Catholic
 Saint George Syrian
 Saint Josephs
 Saint Valentines
 Saints Peter and Paul
 Valley Memorial Park

Major highways
  Interstate 80
  US Route 6
  Illinois Route 29
  Illinois Route 89

Airports and landing strips
 Saint Margarets Hospital Heliport
 Valley Airfield

Rivers
 Illinois River

Landmarks
 Kirby Park

Demographics
As of the 2020 census there were 8,258 people, 3,334 households, and 2,127 families residing in the township. The racial makeup of the township was 83.11% White, 1.30% African American, 0.48% Native American, 0.94% Asian, 0.00% Pacific Islander, 5.86% from other races, and 8.31% from two or more races. Hispanic or Latino of any race were 15.15% of the population.

There were 3,334 households, out of which 26.80% had children under the age of 18 living with them, 48.92% were married couples living together, 9.66% had a female householder with no spouse present, and 36.20% were non-families. 30.40% of all households were made up of individuals, and 16.50% had someone living alone who was 65 years of age or older. The average household size was 2.27 and the average family size was 2.81.

The township's age distribution consisted of 20.4% under the age of 18, 8.2% from 18 to 24, 22.4% from 25 to 44, 28.1% from 45 to 64, and 20.8% who were 65 years of age or older. The median age was 43.8 years. For every 100 females, there were 99.8 males. For every 100 females age 18 and over, there were 96.0 males.

The median income for a household in the township was $51,740, and the median income for a family was $64,836. Males had a median income of $43,586 versus $21,817 for females. The per capita income for the township was $27,947. About 10.6% of families and 12.5% of the population were below the poverty line, including 21.1% of those under age 18 and 7.0% of those age 65 or over.

Political districts
 Illinois's 11th congressional district
 Spring Valley and part of Dalzell are in Illinois's 18th congressional district
 State House District 76
 State Senate District 38

References
 
 US Census Bureau 2007 TIGER/Line Shapefiles
 United States National Atlas

External links
 City-Data.com
 Illinois State Archives

Townships in Bureau County, Illinois
Populated places established in 1849
Townships in Illinois
1849 establishments in Illinois